Jörgen Ingmar Kruth (born May 8, 1974) is a retired Swedish professional kickboxer and mixed martial artist. He is a former two time World Muay Thai Council Heavyweight Muaythai World Champion. He is considered to be among the greatest Scandinavian kickboxers of all time.

Biography and career

Muay Thai career
Jörgen started practicing martial arts first time in 1984. He tried Judo and Jujutsu and couple years later switched over to taekwondo. It was not until 1987 when he came in contact with Muay Thai first time.  He started to train under Po Lindwall.

Kruth had his first Muay Thai fight in 1988 at the age of 14. In 1993 he had 3 amateur boxing bouts and as well as two Savate fights. In 1994, at the age of 19, he became Nordic Muaythai Champion.

In 1995, Kruth participated at IAMTF Amateur World Muay Thai Championships in Bangkok. He worked his way all the way to the final where he lost against a Thai and went home with a silver medal in -81 kg.

In 1996, he became the Amateur Muay Thai World Champion for the first time and defended this title in 1997 as well.

In 1997 Jörgen changed his training center to his current club, Vallentuna Boxing Camp (VBC) and a year later turned pro. He won his first two professional fights by KO at the famous Rajadamnern Stadium in Bangkok and became WKA Muay Thai Cruiserweight World Champion.

In 1999 Jörgen Kruth fought in Japan for the first time and won by KO. He followed up his strong debut by knocking out all three opponents in the same night at K-1 World GP tournament in Zagreb.

In 2004, Kruth became the WMC Heavyweight Muay Thai World Champion defeating Polish-Australian Paul Slowinski. In February 2005, he defended his title against Sergei Gur from Belarus,

MMA career
Kruth made his professional MMA debut in April 2009. He amassed an undefeated record of 5 wins over the next couple of years with none of his fights having reached the second round.

Kruth was expected to make his UFC debut on April 14, 2012 against Cyrille Diabaté at UFC on Fuel TV 2.  However, Kruth was forced out of the bout with an injury and replaced by Tom DeBlass.

Kruth was expected to finally make his UFC debut against Fabio Maldonado on September 29, 2012 at UFC on Fuel TV 5 in Nottingham, England. However it was reported on September 7, 2012 that Kruth dropped out of his fight with Maldonado to retire from combat sports.

Titles 
Professional
 2004 WMC Superheavyweight Muay Thai World Champion
 2004 K-1 Italy Champion
 2003 K-1 World Grand Prix Preliminary Holland Champion
 2001 K-1 Holland GP in Arnhem Runner Up
 2000 K-1 Grand Prix Europe Champion
 1998 WKA Muaythai Cruiserweight World Champion
Amateur
 1997 WKA Amateur World Championships, Copenhagen, Denmark 
 1997 IAMTF World Amateur Muaythai Championships, Bangkok, Thailand 
 1996 IAMTF World Amateur Muaythai Champion, Bangkok, Thailand 
 1995 IAMTF World Amateur Muaythai World Champion, Bangkok, Thailand  (-81 kg)
 1994 Nordic Muay Thai Champion

Kickboxing record

|-  bgcolor="#CCFFCC"
| 2010-11-27 || Win ||align=left| Bob Sapp || K-1 Scandinavia Rumble of the Kings 2010 || Stockholm, Sweden || TKO (Corner stoppage/left knee strike) || 1 || 1:19
|-  bgcolor="#CCFFCC"
| 2007-05-20 || Win ||align=left| Freddy Kemayo || K-1 Scandinavia 2007 || Stockholm, Sweden || Decision (Unanimous) || 3 || 3:00
|-  bgcolor="#FFBBBB"
| 2006-12-16 || Loss ||align=left| Dzevad Poturak || K-1 Fighting Network Prague Round '07 || Prague, Czech Republic || Decision (Unanimous) || 3 || 3:00
|-  bgcolor="#CCFFCC"
| 2006-11-24 || Win ||align=left| Azem Maksutaj || K-1 World MAX North European Qualification 2007 || Stockholm, Sweden || KO (Knee) || 1 || 1:30
|-  bgcolor="#CCFFCC"
| 2006-05-20 || Win ||align=left| Francois Botha || K-1 Scandinavia Grand Prix 2006 || Stockholm, Sweden || Decision (Unanimous) || 3 || 3:00
|-  bgcolor="#FFBBBB"
| 2005-12-18 || Loss ||align=left| Dzevad Poturak || Heaven or Hell 5 || Prague, Czech Republic || Decision (Unanimous) || 3 || 3:00
|-  bgcolor="#CCFFCC"
| 2005-02-19 || Win ||align=left| Sergei Gur || SM Thaiboxing Gala || Stockholm, Sweden || Decision (Unanimous) || 5 || 3:00
|-
! style=background:white colspan=9 |
|-
|-  bgcolor="#CCFFCC"
| 2004-12-19 || Win ||align=left| Ivica Perkovic || Heaven or Hell 4 || Prague, Czech Republic || TKO || 2 || 
|-  bgcolor="#CCFFCC"
| 2004-09-05 || Win ||align=left| Paul Slowinski || SM Thaiboxing Gala || Stockholm, Sweden || Decision (Unanimous) || 5 || 3:00
|-
! style=background:white colspan=9 |
|-
|-  bgcolor="#FFBBBB"
| 2004-08-07 || Loss ||align=left| Brecht Wallis || K-1 World Grand Prix 2004 in Las Vegas II || Las Vegas, Nevada || Decision (Unanimous) || 3 || 3:00
|-  bgcolor="#CCFFCC"
| 2004-08-07 || Win ||align=left| Rony Sefo || K-1 World Grand Prix 2004 in Las Vegas II || Las Vegas, Nevada || Decision (Unanimous) || 3 || 3:00
|-  bgcolor="#CCFFCC"
| 2004-04-24 || Win ||align=left| Vitali Akhramenko || K-1 Italy Grand Prix 2004 in Milan || Milan, Italy || Decision (Unanimous) || 3 || 3:00
|-
! style=background:white colspan=9 |
|-
|-  bgcolor="#CCFFCC"
| 2004-04-24 || Win ||align=left| Josip Bodrozic || K-1 Italy Grand Prix 2004 in Milan || Milan, Italy || KO (Right overhand) || 3 || 2:59
|-  bgcolor="#CCFFCC"
| 2004-04-24 || Win ||align=left| Ivica Perkovic || K-1 Italy Grand Prix 2004 in Milan || Milan, Italy || TKO (Ref. stop/three knockdowns) || 2 || 2:30
|-  bgcolor="#CCFFCC"
| 2004-02-14 || Win ||align=left| Vitali Akhramenko || K-1 Scandinavia 2004 World Qualification || Stockholm, Sweden || Decision (Unanimous) || 3 || 3:00
|-  bgcolor="#FFBBBB"
| 2003-06-15 || Loss ||align=left| Paul Slowinski || Knees of Fury IV || Adelaide, Australia || TKO (Doc. stop/elbow) || 1 ||
|-  bgcolor="#FFBBBB"
| 2003-05-30 || Loss ||align=left| Xhavit Bajrami || K-1 World Grand Prix 2003 in Basel || Basel, Switzerland || Ext. R Decision (Split) || 4 || 3:00
|-  bgcolor="#CCFFCC"
| 2003-04-06 || Win ||align=left| Samir Benazzouz || K-1 Holland Grand Prix 2003 || Zoetermeer, Netherlands || Decision (Unanimous) || 3 || 3:00
|-
! style=background:white colspan=9 |
|-
|-  bgcolor="#CCFFCC"
| 2003-04-06 || Win ||align=left| Andrei Zuravkov || K-1 Holland Grand Prix 2003 || Zoetermeer, Netherlands || Ext.R Decision (Majority) || 4 || 3:00
|-  bgcolor="#FFBBBB"
| 2003-04-06 || Loss ||align=left| Brecht Wallis || K-1 Holland Grand Prix 2003 || Zoetermeer, Netherlands || Ext.R Decision (Majority) || 4 || 3:00
|-  bgcolor="#CCFFCC"
| 2003-03-15 || Win ||align=left| Vitali Akhramenko || K-1 World Grand Prix 2003 Preliminary Scandinavia || Stockholm, Sweden ||Decision (Unanimous) || 5 || 3:00
|-  bgcolor="#CCFFCC"
| 2003-02-22 || Win ||align=left| Ryuto Noji || Ichigeki Tokyo || Tokyo, Japan || Decision (Unanimous) || 5 || 3:00
|-  bgcolor="#FFBBBB"
| 2002-03-03 || Loss ||align=left| Jan Nortje || K-1 World Grand Prix 2002 in Nagoya || Nagoya, Japan || KO (Left punch) || 2 || 1:38
|-  bgcolor="#FFBBBB"
| 2001-08-11 || Loss ||align=left| Maurice Smith || K-1 World Grand Prix 2001 in Las Vegas || Las Vegas, Nevada || Decision (Unanimous) || 3 || 3:00
|-  bgcolor="#FFBBBB"
| 2001-06-09 || Loss ||align=left| Gregory Tony || K-1 World Grand Prix 2001 Preliminary Scandinavia || Copenhagen, Denmark || Disqualification || 3 || 2:38
|-  bgcolor="#CCFFCC"
| 2001-03-17 || Win ||align=left| Stefan Leko || K-1 Gladiators 2001 || Yokohama, Japan || KO (Right hook) || 2 || 2:19
|-  bgcolor="#FFBBBB"
| 2001-02-04 || Loss ||align=left| Jerrel Venetiaan || K-1 Holland GP 2001 in Arnhem || Arnhem, Netherlands || TKO (Doctor stoppage) || 1 || 
|-
! style=background:white colspan=9 |
|-
|-  bgcolor="#CCFFCC"
| 2001-02-04 || Win ||align=left| Marc de Wit || K-1 Holland GP 2001 in Arnhem || Arnhem, Netherlands || Decision (Unanimous) || 3 || 3:00
|-  bgcolor="#CCFFCC"
| 2001-02-04 || Win ||align=left| Peter Varga || K-1 Holland GP 2001 in Arnhem || Arnhem, Netherlands || KO (High kick) || 2 || 
|-  bgcolor="#FFBBBB"
| 2000-10-09 || Loss ||align=left| Mike Bernardo || K-1 World Grand Prix 2000 in Fukuoka || Fukuoka, Japan || KO (Right overhand) || 1 || 2:24
|-  bgcolor="#CCFFCC"
| 2000-09-01 || Win ||align=left| Xhavit Bajrami || K-1 Grand Prix Europe 2000 || Zagreb, Croatia || KO (High kick) || 3 || 
|-
! style=background:white colspan=9 |
|-
|-  bgcolor="#CCFFCC"
| 2000-09-01 || Win ||align=left| Drazo Orduri || K-1 Grand Prix Europe 2000 || Zagreb, Croatia || KO (Knees) || 1 ||
|-  bgcolor="#CCFFCC"
| 2000-09-01 || Win ||align=left| Tony Katoni || K-1 Grand Prix Europe 2000 || Zagreb, Croatia || KO (Punch) || 1 ||
|-  bgcolor="#FFBBBB"
| 2000-03-13 || Loss ||align=left| Alexey Ignashov ||  Night Club "Reaktor" || Minsk, Belarus || Decision (Unanimous) || 5 || 3:00
|-
! style=background:white colspan=9 |
|-
|-  bgcolor="#FFBBBB"
| 1999-08-15 || Loss ||align=left| Alexey Ignashov ||  Queen's Birthday, Rajamangala Stadium || Bangkok, Thailand || KO || 2 || 
|-
! style=background:white colspan=9 |
|-  bgcolor="#CCFFCC"
| 1998 || Win ||align=left|  || || || KO || 1 || 
|-
! style=background:white colspan=9 |
|-  bgcolor="#CCFFCC"
| 1998 || Win ||align=left|  || Rajadamnern Stadium || Bangkok, Thailand || KO ||  || 
|-
|-  bgcolor="#CCFFCC"
| 1998 || Win ||align=left|  || Rajadamnern Stadium || Bangkok, Thailand || KO ||  || 
|-
|-  bgcolor="#CCFFCC"
| 1994-12-03 || Win ||align=left|  || Novahalli || Helsinki, Finland || Decision (Unanimous) || 5 || 3:00
|-

|-  bgcolor="#CCFFCC"
| 2004-04-17 || Win ||align=left| Marek Zelo || Baltic Hall, Mariehamn, Finland || Decision (Unanimous) || 4 || 3:00 || 1-0
|-
| colspan=9 | Legend:

Mixed martial arts record

|-
|  Win
|align=center|5-0
| Yusuke Kawaguchi
|TKO (punches and elbows)
|Rumble of the Kings 6
|
|align=center| 1 
|align=center| 3:18
| Stockholm, Sweden
|
|-
|  Win 
|align=center| 4-0
|Tadas Sapoka
| TKO (submission to punches)
|International Fighting Arena 2
|
|align=center| 1 
|align=center| 0:38
| Uppsala, Sweden 
|
|-
|  Win 
|align=center| 3-0
| Jaime Fletcher
| TKO (punches)
| K-1 Rumble of the Kings 2009 in Stockholm 
|
|align=center| 1 
|align=center| 4:25 
| Stockholm, Sweden
|
|-
|  Win 
|align=center| 2-0
| Tadas Levickas
| Submission (triangle choke) 
| K-1 Rumble of the Kings Qualification 2009 Malmö 
|
|align=center| 1 
|align=center| 0:50 
| Malmö, Sweden
|
|- 
|  Win 
|align=center| 1-0
|Arturas Liutika
| TKO (punches)
| World Freefight Challenge 8 "D-Day" 
|
|align=center| 1 
|align=center| 0:35 
| Ljubljana, Slovenia 
|

See also
Muay Thai
List of K-1 events
List of male kickboxers

References

External links

Vallentuna Boxing Camp
Profile at K-1

1974 births
Cruiserweight kickboxers
Heavyweight boxers
Heavyweight kickboxers
Heavyweight mixed martial artists
Mixed martial artists utilizing boxing
Mixed martial artists utilizing Muay Thai
Mixed martial artists utilizing savate
Mixed martial artists utilizing judo
Mixed martial artists utilizing jujutsu
Living people
Sportspeople from Stockholm 
Swedish male kickboxers
Swedish male mixed martial artists
Swedish Muay Thai practitioners
Swedish male judoka
Swedish jujutsuka
Swedish sportspeople in doping cases
Swedish male boxers
Swedish savateurs